Trachyrincus is a genus of rattail fish in the family Trachyrincidae.

Species
There are currently six recognized species in this genus:
 Trachyrincus aphyodes P. J. McMillan, 1995
 Trachyrincus helolepis C. H. Gilbert, 1892 (Armourhead grenadier)
 Trachyrincus longirostris (Günther, 1878) (Slender unicorn rattail)
 Trachyrincus murrayi Günther, 1887 (Roughnose grenadier)
 Trachyrincus scabrus (Rafinesque, 1810) (Roughsnout grenadier)
 Trachyrincus villegai Pequeño, 1971 (Grey grenadier)

References

Marine fish genera
Gadiformes